Inaya Jaber (1958 – 10 May 2021) was a Lebanese writer, journalist, artist and singer. She has published nine collections of poetry and one collection of short stories. She lived in Beirut.

Biography 
Jaber was born in 1958 in Bint Jbeil in southern Lebanon. She studied at the Lebanese University and at the Lebanese National Conservatory of Music. She wrote a weekly column in al-Quds al-Arabi (London) for over twenty years and was also a contributor to the Lebanese newspaper al-Safir, writing on arts and culture.

In addition to writing, she was a visual artist and singer and has performed concerts internationally including in Egypt and Italy.

Jaber has three adult children, all of whom live in the United States. She lived in Beirut.

Selected works

Short story collection 

 Lā ʼaḥad yuḍīʻu fī bayrūt (No one gets lost in Beirut), 2016

Poetry collections 

 ʻArūḍ al-ḥadīqa (The garden's prosody), 2011
 Lā ʼaḵwāt lī (I have no sisters), 2009
 Jamīʻ ʻasbābinā (All of our reasons), 2006
 Sātān ʼabyaḍ (White satin), 2002
 Ṯumma ʼinnanī mašḡūla (Also, I'm busy), 2000
 ʻAstaʻaddu lil-ʻašāʼ (I'm getting ready for dinner), 1999
 ʼUmūr basīṭa (Simple matters), 1997
 Mizāj ḵāsir (A losing mood), 1995
 Ṭaqs al-ẓullām (Ritual of darkness), 1994

References 

1958 births
2021 deaths
Lebanese women poets
21st-century Lebanese poets
21st-century Lebanese women writers
20th-century Lebanese poets
People from Bint Jbeil District
Conservatoire Libanais alumni
Lebanese University alumni